Aage Myhrvold (29 September 1918 – 16 June 1987) was a Norwegian cyclist. He was born in Kristiania. He competed in the individual and team road race events at the 1948 Summer Olympics. He won the Norwegian National Time Trial Championships in 1939, 1940, 1946, 1947, 1949, 1952 and 1953.

References

External links
 

1918 births
1987 deaths
Cyclists from Oslo
Norwegian male cyclists
Olympic cyclists of Norway
Cyclists at the 1948 Summer Olympics
20th-century Norwegian people